Borradaile may refer to:

People
Lancelot Alexander Borradaile (1872–1945), English zoologist
Osmond Borradaile (1898–1999), Canadian cinematographer
Oswell Borradaile (1859–1935), English cricketer
Taylor A. Borradaile (1885–1977), American chemist
William Borradaile (1792–1838), English cricketer

Places
Borradaile Island, one of the Balleny Islands near Antarctica
 Mount Borradaile, near Gunbalanya, Northern Territory, Australia